Puppebu is one of nine small cabins in the Norwegian island Jan Mayen. It is bordered by the Bay of Walrus. Although Puppebu does not exceed 3 temporary inhabitants, there is a small stone road, called Jan Mayenveien, that runs from Puppebu on the north of the island to Olonkinbyen. Every month, a ship takes supplies to the town, but during the winter season it cannot be accessed from the bay because large blocks of ice form in the water.

References

Geography of Jan Mayen
Populated places of Arctic Norway